Zuienkerke is a municipality located in the Belgian province of West Flanders. The municipality comprises the towns of Houtave, Meetkerke, Nieuwmunster and Zuienkerke proper. On January 1, 2006, Zuienkerke had a total population of 2,776. The total area is 48.86 km2 which gives a population density of 57 inhabitants per km2.

References

External links

Official website  - Available only in Dutch

Municipalities of West Flanders